Babbs Green is a hamlet in the civil parish of Wareside, in the East Hertfordshire district of Hertfordshire, England, located around 3 miles (5 km) north-east of Ware and immediately north of the village of Wareside.

External links

Hamlets in Hertfordshire
Wareside